David Sidney "Dai" Nicholas (12 August 1897 – 7 April 1982) was a Welsh footballer who played in the English Football League for Merthyr Town, Swansea Town and Stoke.

Career
Nicholas was capped by Wales at schoolboy level in 1912 and he was given trials by Merthyr Town but due to World War I he was recruited by the Royal Navy. Towards the end of the war he played several games as an amateur for Swansea before turning professional with Merthyr, only to enter the Carmarthen Training college to begin training as a teacher. In 1921 he joined Stoke and was a 'speedy winger' who performed well on the wing for Stoke before becoming homesick in 1924. He moved back to Swansea Town and also became a teacher in his native Aberdare.

Career statistics

Club
Source:

International
Source:

References

Welsh footballers
Welsh schoolteachers
Swansea City A.F.C. players
Stoke City F.C. players
English Football League players
1897 births
Wales international footballers
1982 deaths
Merthyr Town F.C. players
Association football wingers
Royal Navy personnel of World War I